William Sherman Haynes (1864–1939) was the founder of the William S. Haynes Flute Company of Boston. The company was founded in 1888 and is one of the world's leading makers of concert flutes.

Career
Haynes was a master silversmith. He was the son of a sea captain and a school teacher. Haynes established his flute-making shop, Wm S Haynes Co., in Piedmont Street in the Bay Village district of Boston, where the business was until moving to Acton, MA in 2010.

Haynes patented his distinctive flute design in 1914, and the company has since become a provider of silver and gold instruments to many of the world's most prominent orchestral, chamber and jazz musicians. High-profile soloists to have performed on a Haynes flute have included Georges Barrère and Jean-Pierre Rampal. They made silver, gold, and 90/10 platinum-iridium alloy flutes for Barrère. The piece Density 21.5 was composed for the latter flute's premiere in 1936 but in fact its density was a bit higher than pure platinum at about 21.6 grammes per cubic centimetre. At US$3,750 in 1935, it cost about four times more than his gold one purchased in 1927 (in real dollars: US $1,250 in 1927 and US$3,750 in 1935 are about US $16,000 and US$65,000, respectively, in 2014 dollars).

Death and legacy
Haynes retired to Florida in 1936 and died there in 1939.

When the recent owner John Fuggetta died, his widow, Stella Fuggetta, sold the company to Eastman Strings in 2004.

Notes

References
 Haynes articles at American Flute Guild
 Official history

External links
 William S. Haynes Flute Company
 Eastman Winds parent company of Haynes Flutes
 Article about Andreas Eastman brand student flutes built by Haynes factory in Beijing
  Article about Glissando Headjoint made by Haynes/Eastman invented by Robert Dick

Businesspeople from Boston
Flute makers
19th-century American businesspeople
1864 births
1939 deaths